Julia Brannen, FRSA, FAcSS, is Professor of the Sociology of the Family at the Institute of Education, University of London. She has an international reputation for her research on family life, work-life issues, and intergenerational relations.

She is seen as a pioneer of mixed method research and an issue of the journal International Journal of Social Research Methodology was dedicated to a celebration of her contribution to the field. Her 2016 book was praised for the strength of the study's mixed methodology.

She is a Fellow of the Academy of Social Sciences and a Visiting Professor at the University of Bergen in Norway.

Selected bibliography

References

British sociologists
Academics of the UCL Institute of Education
Family sociologists
Fellows of the Academy of Social Sciences
Living people
Year of birth missing (living people)
British women sociologists